Muhajir Politics refers to the politics and nationalism of Muhajirs in Pakistan.

Background 
The Muhajirs have started many socio-political groups such as Muttahida Qaumi Movement under Altaf Hussain in 1984, All Pakistan Muslim League under Pervez Musharraf and Pakistan Tehreek-e-Insaaf under Imran Khan as a populist movement, The literacy rate among the Muhajirs is very high in Pakistan. Although the Muhajirs were, socially, urbane and liberal they sided with the country's religious political parties, which were created and dominated by Indian Muslims, such as Jamiat Ulema-i-Pakistan and Jamaat-e-Islami Pakistan.

History

1947-1958 
Since the partition of India in 1947, the Muhajirs to Pakistan largely settled in the Sindh, particularly in the province's capital, Karachi, where the Muhajirs became a majority. As a result of the Muhajir domination of major Sindhi cities, there were been tensions between Muhajirs and the native Sindhis. The Muhajirs, upon their arrival in Pakistan, soon joined the Punjabi-dominated ruling elite of the country due to their high rates of education and urban background. They possessed the required expertise for running Pakistan's nascent bureaucracy and economy.

1958–1965 
From 1958 till the death of Fatima Jinnah the Muhajirs supported Fatima Jinnah. The Muhajir diaspora was upset by Khan’s ideas on institutional framework, and they voted for Fatima Jinnah over Ayub Khan in the first general election in 1964. As a result, Khan’s victory and the ensuing confrontations in Karachi between Muhajirs and Pashtuns fostered a sense of unease.

1965–1971 
With Muhajirs already angry with Ayub Khan after he defeated or allegedly rigged elections, the youth backed Zulfikar Ali Bhutto after he left Ayub's cabinet. Another reason for their support to Bhutto was his anti-India stance, as migrants from India had come to Pakistan it was but a natural reaction.

1971–1988 
The 1970 Pakistani general election on 7 December 1970, saw the emergence of the Bengali dominated Awami League, which won the elections. When an ethnic Sindhi, Zulfikar Ali Bhutto, became the country's prime minister in December 1971, after the 1971 Indo-Pakistani War the Muhajirs feared that they would be further side-lined, this time by the economic and political resurgence of Sindhis under Bhutto. The Muhajirs voted for Jamaat-e-Islami Pakistan and Jamiat Ulema-e-Pakistan. Muhajirs had decisively lost their place in the ruling elite, but they were still an economic force to reckon with (especially in Urban Sindh).

References

Muhajir politics